Fort Trump was a proposed United States military base in Poland. The name "Fort Trump" was initially suggested by the Polish government as a name for the facility, however, officials of the Trump administration requested a different name be considered due to concerns the proposal could be perceived as a personal vanity project for the then-president of the United States, Donald Trump, and not a serious military proposal. "Fort Trump" has continued as a colloquial description of the project, or as an unofficial stand-in name for the proposed facility.

In June 2020, Reuters reported—citing unnamed sources—that the proposal had stalled due to the Polish government's reticence in committing to a U.S. requested funding threshold, though officials of both the U.S. and Polish governments have denied the suggestion. A more modest movement of American troops to existing Polish facilities was later agreed. Critics have asserted that the proposal sought to manipulate President Trump by appealing to his perceived narcissism, and may have succeeded in obtaining favorable treatment.

Background

The United States deployed approximately 4,000 military personnel to Poland during the final years of the presidency of Barack Obama with the stated intent of providing a tripwire force to guard against possible Russian expansion into Eastern Europe. In September 2019, president of Poland, Andrzej Duda visited Washington, D.C. to meet Donald Trump, where he first publicly broached the idea of an expanded American presence in the country. During a press conference in the East Room of the White House, Duda stated:

According to Roll Call, "President Trump considered the words, then raised his brows and pursed his lips before a wry grin took over his face". Another source described Trump as initially reticent on the idea of "Fort Trump", saying only that it should be examined more closely. However, the 116th United States Congress directed a study be commissioned on the proposal. In March 2019, Under Secretary of Defense for Policy John Rood visited Warsaw to discuss details of the project. The US diplomats also unofficially asked the Polish government not to use the term "Fort Trump" as it has been seen as politically controversial, with officials concerned the project could be perceived as a vanity project and not a serious military proposal. It has also been noted that because the United States Congress controls the American Department of Defense budget, and not the president, such a project would be unlikely to obtain funding from the Congress.

Critics have asserted that the proposal was an effort at "[p]laying to the U.S. commander-in-chief's narcissism", and described Donald Trump as "visibly flattered" by the suggestion, and "gloating at the idea". An editorial in The Washington Post proposed that the offer to name the fort after Trump "may have won the Polish government some sympathetic words from the president at the United Nations".

Later developments
In June 2019, Donald Trump ordered the movement of an additional 1,000 United States soldiers to Poland from Germany. Unlike the Fort Trump proposal, the transferred units would be based at existing Polish facilities. The same month, Reuters reported that the U.S. military base proposal was dead after Polish and American officials could not agree on a funding arrangement, with Poland agreeing to contribute $2 billion to the project, less than requested by the Trump administration. Both the American and Polish governments denied the accuracy of the Reuters report, with Polish presidential aide Krzysztof Szczerski describing it as "fake news" and United States Ambassador to Poland Georgette Mosbacher tweeting, in response to the story, that Trump and Duda's "vision for increased US presence in Poland will be even greater than originally outlined". A United States Department of State spokesperson later emailed Reuters saying that talks for a U.S. military base in Poland were proceeding on schedule.

In August 2020, United States Secretary of State Mike Pompeo signed, on behalf of the United States, an agreement with Poland by which that nation would accept the redeployment of a further 5,500 American troops – including the forward command post of V Corps – with the potential for a 20,000-person surge capacity. According to BBC News, initial hopes were for the proposed military base to be the garrison of an entire division; the agreement "falls well short of this. But it sends a clear signal about Mr Trump's preferences" and that the concept "could be as much about politics as it is about strategy".

See also
 List of United States military bases
 Operation Atlantic Resolve
 United States military deployments

References

Poland–United States relations
Presidency of Donald Trump